Players born on or after 1 January 1989 were eligible to participate in the tournament. Players' age as of 14 July 2008 – the tournament's opening day. Players in bold have later been capped at full international level.

Group A

Head coach:  Mihail Madanski

Head coach:  Tibor Sisa

Head coach:  Horst Hrubesch

Head coach:  Ginés Meléndez

Group B

Head coach:  Jakub Dovalil

Head coach:  Brian Eastick

Head coach:  Alexis Alexiou

Head coach:  Francesco Rocca

External links 
Official UEFA site

Footnotes

Squads
UEFA European Under-19 Championship squads